Sphenoptera jugoslavica is a species in the family Buprestidae ("metallic wood-boring beetles"), in the order Coleoptera ("beetles"). A common name for Sphenoptera jugoslavica is "bronze knapweed root borer".
The distribution range of Sphenoptera jugoslavica includes Europe, Northern Asia (excluding China), and North America.

References

Further reading
 A catalog and bibliography of the Buprestoidea of America north of Mexico., Nelson et al. 2008. The Coleopterists Society, Special Publication No. 4. 274 pp.
 American Beetles, Volume II: Polyphaga: Scarabaeoidea through Curculionoidea, Arnett, R.H. Jr., M. C. Thomas, P. E. Skelley and J. H. Frank. (eds.). 2002. CRC Press LLC, Boca Raton, Florida.
 American Insects: A Handbook of the Insects of America North of Mexico, Ross H. Arnett. 2000. CRC Press.
 Bellamy, C. L., and G. H. Nelson / Arnett, Ross H. Jr. et al., eds. (2002). Family 41. Buprestidae Leach, 1815. American Beetles, vol. 2: Polyphaga: Scarabaeoidea through Curculionoidea, 98–112.
 Nelson, Gayle H., George C. Walters Jr., R. Dennis Haines, and Charles L. Bellamy (2008). A Catalog and Bibliography of the Buprestoidea of America North of Mexico. The Coleopterists' Society, Special Publication, no. 4, iv + 274.
 Peterson Field Guides: Beetles, Richard E. White. 1983. Houghton Mifflin Company.
 The world of jewel beetles (Insecta: Coleoptera: Buprestidae), Bellamy C.L.

Buprestidae
Beetles described in 1926